This is a list of diplomatic missions in Saint Lucia.  At present, the country hosts 9 embassies/high commissions. Several other countries have honorary consuls to provide emergency services to their citizens.

Embassies/High Commissions 
Castries

Honorary Consulates

Non-resident embassies and high commissions 

 (Caracas)
 (Barbados)
 (Port-of-Spain)
 (Bogotá)
 (New York City)
 (New York City)
 (Kingston)
 (Bridgetown)
 (New York City)
 (New York City)
 (Kingston)
 (Port-of-Spain)
 (Bogota)
 (Mexico City)
 (Caracas)
 (Bridgetown)
 (Caracas)
 (Port-of-Spain)
 (Caracas)
 (New York City)
 (Port-of-Spain)
 (Santo Domingo)
 (Port-of-Spain)
 (New York City)
 (Paramaribo)
 (Caracas)
 (New York City)
 (Santo Domingo)
 (Caracas)
 (Port-of-Spain)
 (Washington, D.C.)
 (Port-of-Spain)
 (Panama City)
 (Caracas)
 (Washington, D.C.)
 (Washington, D.C.)
 (Havana)
 (Havana)
 (Caracas)
 (Miami)
 (Port-of-Spain)
 (Bridgetown)
 (Bogotá)
 (Bogotá)
 (Bogotá)
 (Caracas)
 (Washington, D.C.)
 (Caracas)
 (Kingston)
 (Havana)
 (Caracas)
 (Kingston)
 (Port-of-Spain)
 (Port-of-Spain)
 (Stockholm)
 (Caracas)
 (Ottawa)
 (Washington, D.C.)
 (Washington, D.C.)
 (Washington, D.C.)
 (Port-of-Spain)
 (Bogota)
 (Bridgetown)
 (Washington, D.C.)
 (Panama City)
 (Havana)
 (Washington, D.C.)
 (Ottawa)

Former Embassy

See also
 Foreign relations of Saint Lucia
 Visa requirements for Saint Lucian citizens

References

Foreign relations of Saint Lucia
Saint Lucia
Diplomatic missions
Diplomatic missions